Ganita Kaumudi (Gaṇitakaumudī) is a treatise on mathematics written by Indian mathematician Narayana Pandita in 1356. It was an arithmetical treatise alongside the other algebraic treatise called "Bijganita Vatamsa" by Narayana Pandit.

Contents
Gaṇita Kaumudī  contains about 475 verses of sūtra (rules), and 395 verses of udāharaṇa (examples).  It is divided into 14 sections (chapters) known as vyavahāras:

1. Prakīrṇaka-vyavahāra 
Weights and measures, length, area, volume, etc. It describes addition, subtraction, multiplication, division, square, square root, cube and cube root. The problems of linear and quadratic equations described here are more complex than in earlier works. 63 rules and 82 examples

2. Miśraka-vyavahāra 
Mathematics pertaining to daily life: “mixture of materials, interest on a principal, payment in instalments, mixing gold objects with different purities and other problems pertaining to linear indeterminate equations for many unknowns” 42 rules and 49 examples

3. Śreḍhī-vyavahāra 
Arithmetic and geometric progressions, sequences and series. The generalization here was crucial for finding the infinite series for sine and cosine. 28 rules and 19 examples.

4. Kṣetra-vyavahāra 
Geometry. 149 rules and 94 examples. Includes special material on cyclic quadratilerals, such as the “third diagonal”.

5. Khāta-vyavahāra 
Excavations. 7 rules and 9 examples.

6. Citi-vyavahāra 
Stacks. 2 rules and 2 examples.

7. Rāśi-vyavahāra 
Mounds of grain. 2 rules and 3 examples.

8. Chāyā-vyavahāra 
Shadow problems. 7 rules and 6 examples.

9. Kuṭṭaka 
Linear integer equations. 69 rules and 36 examples.

10. Vargaprakṛti 
Quadratic. 17 rules and 10 examples. Includes a variant of the Chakravala method. Ganita Kaumudi contains many results from continued fractions. In the text Narayana Pandita used the knowledge of simple recurring continued fraction in the solutions of indeterminate equations of the type .

11. Bhāgādāna 
Factorization. Contains Fermat's factorization method. 11 rules and 7 examples.

12. Rūpādyaṃśāvatāra 
Contains rules for writing a fraction as a sum of unit fractions. 22 rules and 14 examples.

Systematic rules for expressing a fraction as the sum of unit fractions had previously been given in the Gaṇita-sāra-saṅgraha of Mahāvīra. Nārāyaṇa's Gaṇita-kaumudi gave a few more rules: the section bhāgajāti in the twelfth chapter named aṃśāvatāra-vyavahāra contains eight rules. The first few are:

 Rule 1. To express 1 as a sum of n unit fractions:
 

 Rule 2. To express 1 as a sum of n unit fractions:
 

 Rule 3. To express a fraction  as a sum of unit fractions:
 Pick an arbitrary number i such that  is an integer r, write
 
 and find successive denominators in the same way by operating on the new fraction. If i is always chosen to be the smallest such integer, this is equivalent to the greedy algorithm for Egyptian fractions, but the Gaṇita-Kaumudī's rule does not give a unique procedure, and instead states evam iṣṭavaśād bahudhā ("Thus there are many ways, according to one's choices.")

 Rule 4. Given  arbitrary numbers ,
 

 Rule 5. To express 1 as the sum of fractions with given numerators :

13. Aṅka-pāśa 
Combinatorics. 97 rules and 45 examples. Generating permutations (including of a multiset), combinations, partitions of a number, binomial coefficients, generalized Fibonacci numbers.

Narayana Pandita noted the equivalence of the figurate numbers and the formulae for the number of combinations of different things taken so many at a time.

The book contains a rule to determine the number of permutations of n objects and a classical algorithm for finding the next permutation in lexicographic ordering though computational methods have advanced well beyond that ancient algorithm. Donald Knuth describes many algorithms dedicated to efficient permutation generation and discuss their history in his book The Art of Computer Programming.

14. Bhadragaṇita  
Magic squares. 60 rules and 17 examples.

Editions
 "Translation of  Ganita Kaumudi with Rationale in modern mathematics and historical notes" by S L Singh, Principal, Science College, Gurukul Kangri Vishwavidyalaya, Haridwar
 Ganita Kaumudi, Volume 1–2, Nārāyana Pandita (Issue 57 of Princess of Wales Sarasvati Bhavana Granthamala: Abhinava nibandhamālā Padmakara Dwivedi Jyautishacharya 1936)

References
Notes

Bibliography
 
 M. D. Srinivas, M. S. Sriram, K. Ramasubramanian, Mathematics in India - From Vedic Period to Modern Times. Lectures 25–27.

External links
Ganita Kaumudi Part 1 (1936)
Ganita Kaumudi Part 2 (1942)
Ganita Kaumudi and the Continued Fraction

Indian mathematics
Social history of India
1356 works
14th century in science
1350s books